Novo Santo Antônio (Portuguese for "New Saint Anthony") is a Brazilian municipality of the state of Piauí. The population is 3,003 (2020 est.) in an area of 481.71 km².

The municipality contains the  Araguaia State Park, created in 2001.

References

External links
 citybrazil.com.br 
 Altair on Explorevale 

Municipalities in Piauí